Minara Station is a pastoral lease that has operated as a sheep station and is now a cattle station in Western Australia.

The station was established prior to 1920, when it was running sheep and owned by Messrs Fawcett and Robinson. By 1924 the owners were Fawcett and Venn.

In 1928 Minara was stocked with 12,000 sheep and the shearing shed was being constructed.

The station is currently owned by Minara Resources along with three other nearby properties: Nambi, Yundamindera and Glenorn.
By 2018 all four stations were running a herd of cattle of 6500 head.

See also
List of ranches and stations
List of pastoral leases in Western Australia

References

Homesteads in Western Australia
Pastoral leases in Western Australia
Stations (Australian agriculture)
Goldfields-Esperance